Bone Dance is a 1991 novel by American writer Emma Bull, described variously as fantasy, hard science fiction and cyberpunk. It was nominated for the Hugo, Nebula and World Fantasy Awards in 1992.

Setting
Although the city in which Bone Dance is set is not named, it appears to be a climate-modified Minneapolis, the author's setting for her first novel, War for the Oaks. The novel features references to Tarot (each of ten sections is named for a card) and Louisiana Voodoo. It is subtitled "A Fantasy for Technophiles" and the central place of devices generally, and electronics specifically, justifies that label. Since the time is a post-nuclear-clash future following a war between the Americas, North and South, skill at maintaining and repairing salvaged artifacts is valuable. So are pre-collapse artifacts themselves. Sparrow, the point-of-view character, makes a living by bartering such skill, along with occasional sales of scavenged artifacts. Sparrow is a bioengineered human, though that case is not plainly stated until half-way through the story.

Plot summary
In the opening scene, Sparrow cannot recall what took place in the preceding 36 hours. Awakening yet again in a novel place with new hurts, the urge to fix the problem is intense. On the way to enlightenment comes a cryptic Tarot reading from friend Sherrea, abduction by a dead man animated by what might as well be a Loa, and introduction to a Vodun-based community that is dedicated to replacement, and if necessary to overthrow, of the status quo in the city. The latter has the individual most responsible for the inter-continental war near its power apex, a character who is also the revenge target of another survivor from his kind. Those are the "Horsemen", modified people who can move their consciousness from body to body.

The second half of the story shows Sparrow's awkward progress toward a fully human condition and becoming a valued member of a community, and is capped by a closing conceit: that the whole telling has been an autobiography.

Reception
Bone Dance is regarded by scholars as defying genre and gender conventions: its setting blends fantasy with hard science fiction, while its protagonist blurs gender boundaries. Academic Veronica Hollinger termed the book "a feminist revision of 1980s cyberpunk", noting that its hard-boiled tone shared similarities to William Gibson's Neuromancer. The novel employs cyberpunk motifs such as mind control and genetic engineering to explore themes of gender identity. The construction of Sparrow's self-identity was described by academic Jane Donawerth as reminiscent of Mary Shelley's Frankenstein.

Bone Dance was nominated for numerous awards, including the Hugo, Locus, Nebula and World Fantasy Awards, and received a special citation at the Philip K. Dick Award.

References

Sources

 
 
 
 

1991 American novels
American fantasy novels
Contemporary fantasy novels
Fiction about Louisiana Voodoo
Novels set in Minneapolis